Rosa María García-Malea López (born 1981) became the first female fighter pilot in the Spanish Air Force after qualifying to fly jet fighter aircraft in 2006.

Early life
Rosa García-Malea López was born in 1981 in Almería, Spain.

Military service
García-Malea is one of the first female fighter pilots in the Spanish Air Force  qualified to fly F/A-18 Hornet, With more than 1,250 flight hours and after participating in the Libyan war in 2011, after 15 years service in Spanish air force, she joined Patrulla Águila the aerobatic demonstration team as a Casa C-101 pilot. In 2018 she was awarded the Medalla de Andalucía for her achievements.

References

1981 births
Living people
Spanish Air and Space Force
People from Almería

Spanish women aviators